Nathan Christoffel is an Australian film director from Byron Bay, New South Wales.

In 2009 he completed his debut feature, Eraser Children (winner of 'Best Australian Film' and 'Best supporting actor' at the Melbourne Underground Film Festival 2009' and 'Best Australian Film' at FPFF 2009).

He is the owner of production company Picture Co which opened its Melbourne office in 2016.

Film career

2009: Eraser Children
A dystopian satire ' Eraser Children' had success on the festival circuit, screening at film festivals all around the world.

Short Synopsis

In a dystopia of useless products, pre-paid dreams, and a system of 'violations' so invasive that if you laugh too loudly you will be fined, Misner Corporation has invented a new source of energy, generating a monopoly on all facets of human existence. The world is now a totalitarian global state ruled by one man. Anyone unwilling to work for Misner's regime lives underground in a dark world of insane system 'dropouts'. Finnegan Wright, a lower level worker at Misner Corp. is taken on an enthralling journey when one of these dropouts kidnaps Finnegan and tries to convince him to change the fate of the world by killing Misner.

Sydney International Sci Fi Film festival co-director Lisa Mitchell said. "Director Nathan Christoffel and his cast and crew, deserve to be warmly congratulated. To have independently produced such a visually and conceptually sophisticated film as their feature debut is a major accomplishment and a testament to the creativity of Australian genre cinema". 

The first screening of Eraser Children was a sell out screening of the unfinished film at the Melbourne Underground Film Festival in 2009. The Film went on to take the top award at that festival winning 'Best Australian Film' and 'Best Supporting Actor' Shane Nagle.

Filmography
Short Films

Feature films

References

General references
Sidestreet interview with Christoffel 2010
Screen Anarchy article on 1629 announcement
A Night of Horror film festival chats to Christoffel and Co
Eraser Children listing Sci Fi London
Guardian article about UK screening of Eraser Children
Article on campaign directed by Christoffel

External links

Picture Co site
The Freaks Official Site
Eraser Children IMDB site
1629 site

Living people
Australian film directors
1982 births